Jefferson County is a county located in the U.S. state of Colorado. As of the 2020 census, the population was 582,910, making it the fourth-most populous county in Colorado. The county seat is Golden, and the most populous city is Lakewood.

Jefferson County is included in the Denver-Aurora-Lakewood, CO Metropolitan Statistical Area. Located along the Front Range of the Rocky Mountains, Jefferson County is adjacent to the state capital of Denver.

In 2010, the center of population of Colorado was located in Jefferson County.

The county's slogan is the "Gateway to the Rocky Mountains", and it is commonly nicknamed Jeffco. The name Jeffco is incorporated in the name of the Jeffco School District, the Jeffco Business Center Metropolitan District No. 1, and several businesses located in Jefferson County. Jeffco is also incorporated in the unofficial monikers of many Jefferson County agencies. The Rocky Mountain Metropolitan Airport operated by Jefferson County was previously known as the Jeffco Airport.

A major employer in Jefferson County is the large Coors Brewing Company in Golden. Also, the state-supported Colorado School of Mines, a university specializing in mining, geology, chemistry, and engineering is located in Jefferson County.

History
On August 25, 1855, the Kansas Territorial Legislature created Arapahoe County to govern the entire western portion of the territory. The county was named for the Arapaho Nation of Native Americans who lived in the region.

On June 22, 1858, gold was discovered along the South Platte River in Arapahoe County (in present-day Englewood). This discovery precipitated the Pike's Peak Gold Rush. Many residents of the mining region felt disconnected from the remote territorial governments of Kansas and Nebraska, so they voted to form their own Territory of Jefferson on October 24, 1859. The following month, the Jefferson Territorial Legislature organized 12 counties for the new territory, including Jefferson County. Jefferson County was named for the namesake of the Jefferson Territory, Thomas Jefferson, the principal author of the Declaration of Independence and the nation's third president.  Golden City served as the county seat of Jefferson County.  Robert Williamson Steele, Governor of the Provisional Government of the Territory of Jefferson from 1859 to 1861, built his home in the county at Mount Vernon and later at Apex.

The Jefferson Territory never received federal sanction, but during his last week in office, President James Buchanan signed an act which organized the Territory of Colorado on February 28, 1861. That November 1, the new Colorado General Assembly organized the 17 original counties of Colorado, including a new Jefferson County. Several annexations by the City & County of Denver and the 2001 consolidation of the City & County of Broomfield removed the east and extreme northeastern corner of the county, respectively.

Geography

Adjacent counties
Jefferson County is one of the few counties in the United States to border as many as ten counties.

Boulder County – north
City and County of Broomfield – northeast
Adams County – east
City and County of Denver – east
Arapahoe County – east
Douglas County – east
Teller County – south
Park County – southwest
Clear Creek County – west
Gilpin County – northwest

Major highways
  Interstate 70

  U.S. Highway 6
  U.S. Highway 40
  U.S. Highway 285
  State Highway 8
  State Highway 58
  State Highway 72
  State Highway 74
  State Highway 75
  State Highway 93
  State Highway 121
  State Highway 391
  State Highway 470
 Chatfield Ave
 44th Ave

Recreational areas

Alderfer/Three Sisters Park
Apex Park
Bear Creek Lake Park
Centennial Cone Park
Clear Creek Canyon Park
Coal Creek Canyon
Crown Hill Park
Deer Creek Canyon Park
Elk Meadow Park
Evergreen Lake
Fairmount Trail
Flying J Ranch Park
Hildebrand Ranch Park
Hiwan Homestead Museum
Lair o' the Bear Park
Lewis Meadows Park
Lookout Mountain Nature Center
Matthews/Winters Park
Meyer Ranch Park
Mount Falcon Park
Mount Galbraith Park
Mount Glennon
Mount Lindo
North Table Mountain Park
Pine Valley Ranch Park
Ranson/Edwards Homestead Ranch
Reynolds Park
Sister City Park
South Table Mountain Park
South Valley Park
Standley Lake Regional Park
Van Bibber Park
Welchester Tree Grant Park
White Ranch Park
Windy Saddle Park
Urban Trails

Demographics

As of the census of 2000, there were 527,056 people, 206,067 households, and 140,537 families residing in the county. The population density was 683 people per square mile (264 people/km). There were 212,488 housing units at an average density of 275 people per square mile (106 people/km). The racial makeup of the county was
{|
|-
|  ||  || White 
|-
|  || || Black or African American 
|-
|  || || Native American 
|-
|  || || Asian 
|-
|  || || Pacific Islander 
|-
|  || || from other races 
|-
|colspan="3"| 
|-
|colspan="3"| 
|}

There were 206,067 households, out of which 33.40% had children under age 18 living with them, 55.10% were married couples living together, 9.10% had a female householder with no husband present, and 31.80% were non-families. 24.50% of all households were made up of individuals, of those 6.30% were someone living alone who was 65 years of age or older. The average household size was 2.52, and the average family size was 3.03 persons.

In the county, the population ages were spread out:
{|
|-
|  ||  || under age 18
|-
|  || || aged 18–24
|-
|  || || aged 25–44
|-
|  || || aged 45–64
|-
|  || || 65 years of age or older
|-
|colspan="3"| 

|}

For every 100 females there were 99.00 males. For every 100 females age 18 and over, there were 96.80 males.

The median income for a household in the county was $57,339, and the median income for a family was $67,310. Males had a median income of $45,306 versus $32,372 for females. The per capita income for the county was $28,066. About 3.40% of families and 5.20% of the population were below the poverty line, including 5.80% of those under age 18, and 5.10% of those age 65 or over.

According to a report in the JAMA, residents of Jefferson County had a 2014 life expectancy of 80.02 years.

Education
The sole school district serving the county is Jefferson County School District R-1.

Private schools
 Colorado Academy

Tertiary institutions
 Colorado Christian University
 Colorado School of Trades

Jefferson County Public Library is the county library system.

Government and infrastructure
The Federal Correctional Institution, Englewood is in unincorporated Jefferson County.
The Rocky Flats Plant produced nuclear weapons in Jefferson County from 1952 until 1989.
The Jefferson County Public Library, established in 1952.
The Jefferson County Government Center, also known as the "Taj Mahal".
The Denver Federal Center, the largest concentration of federal government agencies outside of Washington, D.C., is located in Lakewood.

Sheriff's office
The Jefferson County Sheriff's Office responded to the 1999 Columbine High School massacre, and investigated it together with the F.B.I. The Sheriff's Office received backlash after it was revealed the agency had the perpetrators Eric Harris and Dylan Klebold in and out of custody prior to the shooting. After the shooting Sue Klebold sued the Sheriff's office for failing to prevent their son from carrying out the Columbine High shootings. According to a "notice of intent to sue" filed by Susan and Thomas Klebold, county officials were "reckless, willful and wanton" in the way they handled a 1998 police report about Eric Harris' Internet ravings.
This lawsuit was dismissed along with several others pertaining to the shooting.

Politics
Jefferson County was a Republican stronghold for most of the 20th century. However, it has voted Democratic in every presidential election since 2008, consistent with the general trend in the Denver metropolitan area. In 2020, Joe Biden won the largest percentage for a Democratic presidential candidate since 1916.

Recreation

State parks
Chatfield State Park
Golden Gate Canyon State Park
Staunton State Park

National forests and wilderness
Pike National Forest
Roosevelt National Forest
Lost Creek Wilderness

National wildlife refuges
Rocky Flats National Wildlife Refuge
Two Ponds National Wildlife Refuge

Historic trail
South Platte Trail

Recreational trails
American Discovery Trail
Apex National Recreation Trail
Big Dry Creek National Recreation Trail
Colorado Trail
Platte River Greenway National Recreation Trail
Two Ponds National Recreation Trail

Scenic byway
Lariat Loop Scenic and Historic Byway

Golf course
Hiwan Golf Club

Indian Tree Golf Club

Communities

Cities

Arvada (part)
Edgewater
Golden
Lakewood
Littleton (part)
Westminster (part)
Wheat Ridge

Towns

Bow Mar (part)
Lakeside
Morrison
Mountain View
Superior (part)

Census-designated places

Applewood
Aspen Park
Brook Forest
Coal Creek (part)
Columbine
Dakota Ridge
East Pleasant View
Evergreen
Fairmount
Genesee
Idledale
Indian Hills
Ken Caryl
Kittredge
West Pleasant View

Unincorporated communities

Buffalo Creek
Conifer
Foxton
Pine
Pine Junction
Plastic

See also

Arapahoe County, Kansas Territory
Denver-Aurora, CO Combined Statistical Area
Denver-Aurora-Lakewood, CO Metropolitan Statistical Area
Front Range Urban Corridor
Index of Colorado-related articles
Jefferson County, Colorado Territory
Jefferson County, Jefferson Territory
List of statistical areas in Colorado
National Register of Historic Places listings in Jefferson County, Colorado
North Central Colorado Urban Area
Outline of Colorado
Pike's Peak Gold Rush

References

External links

Jefferson County Government website
Colorado County Evolution by Don Stanwyck
Colorado Historical Society
Jefferson County Open Space Parks

 

 
Colorado counties
1861 establishments in Colorado Territory
Denver metropolitan area
Populated places established in 1861